Mount Ajo is a mountain located in Pima County, Arizona.

See also
List of mountain peaks of Arizona

References

Mountains of Pima County, Arizona
Mountains of Arizona